Oecomys is a genus of rodent within the tribe Oryzomyini of family Cricetidae. It contains about 17 species, which live in trees and are distributed across forested parts of South America, extending into Panama and Trinidad.

References

Literature cited
Carleton, M.D., Emmons, L.H. and Musser, G.G. 2009. A new species of the rodent genus Oecomys (Cricetidae: Sigmodontinae: Oryzomyini) from eastern Bolivia, with emended definitions of O. concolor (Wagner) and O. mamorae (Thomas). American Museum Novitates 3661:1–32.

 
Rodent genera
Taxa named by Oldfield Thomas